Jean-Sébastien Jaurès (born 30 September 1977) is a French former professional footballer who played as defender for AJ Auxerre and Bundesliga club Borussia Mönchengladbach. Whilst at Auxerre he helped them win the Coupe de France in 2005, starting in the final.

References

External links
 

1977 births
Living people
Sportspeople from Tours, France
French footballers
Association football defenders
AJ Auxerre players
Borussia Mönchengladbach players
Ligue 1 players
Bundesliga players
France youth international footballers
French expatriate footballers
French expatriate sportspeople in Germany
Expatriate footballers in Germany
French people of Réunionnais descent
Footballers from Centre-Val de Loire
Black French sportspeople